Rud Gaz may refer to:
 Rud Gaz, Sistan and Baluchestan